State Route 3C (SR 3C) was the former route number for Walker Road, an unimproved road that ran from the California state line southwest of Hawthorne (where it becomes Bodie Road) to SR 208 south of Yerington. 

SR 3C was commissioned in the mid-1940s. SR 3C was decommissioned by 1982.

References 

003C